Mitko Todorov Grablev is a Bulgarian weightlifter who competed for Bulgaria. He originally claimed the gold medal in Weightlifting at the 1988 Summer Olympics – Men's 56 kg but was disqualified after he tested positive for furosemide. It became a scandal after another Bulgarian weightlifter Angel Guenchev, who also originally claimed a gold medal in weightlifting, was disqualified for failing drug testing and a positive result for the doping agent furosemide. The Bulgarian weightlifting team was forced to withdraw midway from the weightlifting competition. This was also not the first time the Bulgarian weightlifting team was caught cheating. Numerous Bulgarians were stripped from their medals in the 1976 and 1984 Olympics. It is theorized that since the Games were held in then communist USSR in 1980,  and not a single Summer Olympic athlete of any sport tested positive for doping, still the only Games in the entire Modern Olympic history this occurred, that the testing at those Olympics were flawed. Coincidentally, 5 medalists of those 1980 games in weightlifting (3 Bulgarian 2 Russian) were previously disqualified and stripped of their medals in the 1976 Olympic Games.

References 

Bulgarian male weightlifters
Olympic weightlifters of Bulgaria
Weightlifters at the 1988 Summer Olympics
Bulgarian sportspeople in doping cases
1964 births
Doping cases in weightlifting
Living people
Competitors stripped of Summer Olympics medals
20th-century Bulgarian people
21st-century Bulgarian people